This is a list of notable people from Carleton County, New Brunswick. Although not everyone in this list was born in Carleton County, they all live or have lived in Carleton County and have had significant connections to the communities.

This article does include People from Woodstock for now as they do not have their own section.

See also
List of people from New Brunswick

References

Carleton